Dystopia is the debut album by Australian electronic band Midnight Juggernauts, released in August 2007 by record label Siberia.

At the J Awards of 2007, the album was nominated for Australian Album of the Year.

Release 

Dystopia was released on 4 August 2007. It debuted and peaked at number 21 on the ARIA Albums Chart. A limited edition two-disc version with remixes and songs from previous releases was also released.

Reception 

AllMusic wrote "few bands sound so confident with their sound and clear in their intentions even after several albums, and very few are capable of making a record this good."

Track listing

References

External links 

 

2007 albums
Midnight Juggernauts albums